2043 Ortutay, provisional designation , is a dark asteroid from the outer regions of the asteroid belt, approximately 45 kilometers in diameter. The asteroid was discovered by Hungarian astronomer György Kulin at the Konkoly Observatory, Budapest, on 12 November 1936. It was named after Hungarian ethnographer Gyula Ortutay.

Classification and orbit 

Ortutay orbits the Sun in the outer main-belt at a distance of 2.8–3.5 AU once every 5 years and 6 months (1,999 days). Its orbit has an eccentricity of 0.11 and an inclination of 3° with respect to the ecliptic.

Physical characteristics 

Ortutay has been characterized as an X-type asteroid by Pan-STARRS photometric survey. The body's low albedo suggest that it is a carbonaceous C-type asteroid.

Rotation period 

In December 2013, a rotational lightcurve of Ortutay was obtained from photometric observations by astronomer Kim Lang at the Klokkerholm Observatory in Denmark. Lightcurve analysis gave a rotation period of 7.7475 hours with a brightness variation of 0.44 magnitude.

Diameter and albedo 

According to the surveys carried out by the Japanese Akari satellite and the NEOWISE mission of NASA's Wide-field Infrared Survey Explorer, Ortutay measures between 42.13 and 54.117 kilometers in diameter and its surface has an albedo between 0.0317 and 0.05.

The Collaborative Asteroid Lightcurve Link derives an albedo of 0.0423 and a diameter of 44.69 kilometers based on an absolute magnitude of 10.8.

Naming 

This minor planet was named in memory of Hungarian Gyula Ortutay (1910–1978), a professor of ethnography and Hungarian politician, who fostered the popularization of astronomy. In the late 1940s, he was Hungary's Minister of Religion and Education. The approved naming citation was published by the Minor Planet Center on 1 February 1980.

References

External links 
 Asteroid Lightcurve Database (LCDB), query form (info )
 Dictionary of Minor Planet Names, Google books
 Asteroids and comets rotation curves, CdR – Observatoire de Genève, Raoul Behrend
 Discovery Circumstances: Numbered Minor Planets (1)-(5000) – Minor Planet Center
 
 

002043
Discoveries by György Kulin
Named minor planets
19361112